Calliostoma periglyptum is a species of sea snail, a marine gastropod mollusk in the family Calliostomatidae.

Some authors place this taxon in the subgenus Calliostoma (Fautor) .

Description

Distribution
This species occurs in the Pacific Ocean off the Loyalty Islands at depths between 230 m and 520 m.

References

 Marshall, B.A. (1995). Calliostomatidae (Gastropoda: Trochoidea) from New Caledonia, the Loyalty Islands and the northern Lord Howe Rise . pp. 381–458 in Bouchet, P. (ed.). Résultats des Campagnes MUSORSTOM, Vol. 14 . Mém. Mus. nat. Hist. nat. 167 : 381-458

External links

periglyptum
Gastropods described in 1995